Pomburpa is a village in North Goa, India.

Geography

Places of interest

 Our Lady of Socorro Church
 Church of Our Lady of Miracles
 Pomburpa Spring
 El Cid Farm (Poultry Farm Estd in 1964)

References

External links
 About Pomburpa

Villages in North Goa district